The Ixil (pronounced ) are a Maya people indigenous to Guatemala. The Ixil live in three municipalities in the Cuchumatanes mountains in the northern part of the department El Quiché. These municipalities, also known as the Ixil Triangle, are Santa Maria Nebaj, San Gaspar Chajul, and San Juan Cotzal.

In the early 1980s, the Ixil Community was one of the principal targets of a genocide operation, involving systematic rape, forced displacements and hunger during the Guatemalan civil war. In May 2013 Efraín Ríos Montt was found guilty by a Guatemala court of having ordered the deaths of 1,771 Ixil people. The presiding judge, Jazmin Barrios, declared that "[t]he Ixils were considered public enemies of the state and were also victims of racism, considered an inferior race'. According to a 1999 United Nations truth commission, between 70% and 90% of Ixil villages were razed and 60% of the population in the altiplano region were forced to flee to the mountains between 1982 and 1983. By 1996, it was estimated that some 7,000 Maya Ixil had been killed. The violence was particularly heightened during the period 1979–1985 as successive Guatemalan administrations and the military pursued an indiscriminate scorched-earth (in ) policy.

In 2013, General Efraín Ríos Montt, who served as President of Guatemala from 1982 to 1983, was found guilty of genocide against the Ixil people.

See also
 Ixil language

Notes

References
 
 
 
 
 

Indigenous peoples in Guatemala
Maya peoples of Guatemala
Mesoamerican cultures
Quiché Department